The Leadership Council of the Islamic Emirate of Afghanistan, also translated as the Supreme Council, (also referred to as the Inner Shura) is the central governing body of the Taliban and Afghanistan. The Taliban uses a consensus decision-making model among members of the Leadership Council, though the supreme leader, who chairs the council, has ultimate authority and may override or circumvent it at any time. It played a key role in directing the Taliban insurgency from Quetta, Pakistan, which led to it being informally referred to as the Quetta Shura at the time.

Powers and duties
The council is the supreme governing body of the Taliban and the Government of the Islamic Emirate of Afghanistan. It functions under a consensus decision-making model, and is chaired by the supreme leader. The Leadership Council appoints the supreme leader in the event of a vacancy. Under the first supreme leader, Mullah Omar, the role of the council was purely advisory, but an agreement to rule by consensus was formed upon the contentious appointment of Akhtar Mansour as the second supreme leader. However, the supreme leader may still override or circumvent the council at any time—the consensus model is merely a convention.

Current membership
There are approximately 30 members. The following bodies make up the Leadership Council:

 Border Commission
 Commission for Agriculture, Livestock, Ushr and Zakat
 Commission for Cultural Affairs
 Commission for Financial Affairs
 Commission for Preaching and Guidance, Recruitment and Propagation of Virtue and the Prevention of Vice
 Commission for Prevention of Civilian Casualties and Complaints
 Commission for Prisoners’ Affairs
 Commission for Training, Learning and Higher Education
 Commission of Military Affairs
 Department for the Affairs of Needy, Orphans and Disabled
 Department of Power Distribution
 Economic Commission
 Guidance and Invitation Commission
 Health Commission
 Institutional Commission
 Intelligence Commission
 Leadership Office
 Mining Commission
 Political Office (formerly Commission for Political Affairs)

Inner Shura (1996–2001)
According to U.S. intelligence, the "Inner Shura" of the First Islamic Emirate of Afghanistan was originally a collective leadership body, but gradually lost power as over the course of the Taliban's first year in government as Mullah Omar developed a cult of personality. It had 23 members. Mohammad Ghous was reportedly a member. It was based in Kandahar. Also known as the Supreme Council, it was chaired by Omar.

Quetta Shura (2002–2021)
After the United States invasion of Afghanistan in 2001 and the end of the Taliban government, ten men who had held positions in the government formed a Council of Leaders (Rahbari Shura) in May 2002. They consisted of eight veteran high ranking (i.e. elite) commanders originally from the southern area of Afghanistan, another hailing from Paktika, and another from Paktia. The Shura was subsequently increased in number, during March 2003, to 33 individuals. During October 2006, the Consultative Council (majlis al-shura) was formed, comprising a number of advisors to 13 core members.

Directing the insurgency in Afghanistan

According to retired General of the United States Army Stanley A. McChrystal, the Quetta Shura was directing the Afghani Taliban insurgency. In a report to President Obama in 2009, he stated that it posed the greatest threat to his troops. He said, "Afghanistan's insurgency is clearly supported from Pakistan. The Quetta Shura conducts a formal campaign review each winter, after which Omar announces his guidance and intent for the following year." Americans wanted to extend the drone strikes into Balochistan.

In September 2009 US ambassador to Pakistan Anne W. Patterson said, "In the past, we focussed on Al-Qaeda because they were a threat to us. The Quetta Shura mattered less to us because we had no troops in the region, now our troops are there on the other side of the border, and the Quetta Shura is high on Washington’s list."

Funding from Persian Gulf region
The Taliban leaders raise money from wealthy Persian gulf donors and direct operations in south Afghanistan. According to Lt. Gen. David Barno, the retired former commander of American forces in Afghanistan "The Quetta Shura is extremely important, they are the intellectual and ideological underpinnings of the Taliban insurgency."

Support from Pakistani intelligence
American officials believe that the Quetta Shura gets support from parts of Pakistan's Inter-Services Intelligence (ISI), as some of its senior officials believe that leaders such as Omar would be valuable assets if the Taliban were to regain power after a withdrawal of U.S. forces from Afghanistan.
According to Abdul Rahim Mandokhel, a Pakistani senator from Zhob in northern Balochistan. "The whole war in Afghanistan is being launched from here," he said. He accused Pakistan's intelligence agencies of carrying out a "double" policy. "One thing is clear: the area is being used for cross-border offences," he said.

A report by the London School of Economics (LSE) claimed to provide the most concrete evidence yet that the ISI is providing funding, training and sanctuary to the Taliban insurgency on a scale much larger than previously thought. The report's author Matt Waldman spoke to nine Taliban field commanders in Afghanistan and concluded that Pakistan's relationship with the insurgents ran far deeper than previously realised. Some of those interviewed suggested that the organization even attended meetings of the Taliban's supreme council, the Quetta Shura. A spokesman for the Pakistani military dismissed the report, describing it as "malicious".

Pakistani relationship

Statement
American and western officials have long complained that Pakistan has ignored the presence of senior Taliban leadership in Quetta and done little to address this situation. Pakistani authorities have denied the existence of such an organization in Pakistan. However, statements by US officials have led to fears that US would launch drone strikes on Quetta. Jehan Zeb Jamaldini, senior vice president of Balochistan National Party was quoted as saying that Omar and his 2nd and 3rd tier leadership were around Quetta and would be targeted by the US.Prime Minister of Pakistan Imran Khan rejected the allegations of having Quetta Shura in Pakistan. He said these are just baseless allegations by our enemies. He added that Pakistan is not spokesperson for Taliban. If anyone has queries ask the Taliban directly.

Acknowledgement

In December 2009 Pakistani government for the first time acknowledged the existence of Quetta Shura. The Defence minister of Pakistan, Ahmad Mukhtar acknowledged the presence of Quetta Shura but stated that security forces had damaged it to such an extent that it no longer posed a threat.

On November 23, 2012, when Pakistan released nine senior Taliban leaders, commentator Ali K. Chrishti described a statement from the Pakistani government as its first acknowledgment of the existence of the Quetta Shura.

Arrests

In February 2010, in a possible change in Pakistani policy, several members of the Quetta Shura were detained at various locations in Pakistan.
Top Taliban leader Abdul Ghani Baradar, who ran the Shura, was captured in Karachi in a joint operation by Inter-Services Intelligence and Central Intelligence Agency. He had reportedly gone to Karachi to meet other Shura leaders who had moved to this city in recent months. A few days later two more members of the Quetta Shura, Abdul Kabir and Mohammed Yunis, the Taliban’s shadow governor of Zabul Province, were detained by Pakistani intelligence.
They will be handed over to Kabul if they have not committed crimes in Pakistan.

Analysts were split on the question of why Pakistan moved against these key leaders. Many said that Pakistan had decided it wanted to control any negotiations between the Taliban and the Afghan government. However, according to The News International, the Pakistani establishment, in a major policy shift, had decided not to support the Shura and had arrested 9 of the 18 key members within a period of 2 weeks. The policy shift was made after pressure from the US as well as a request from the Saudi Royal family

Coalition efforts at negotiations
In November 2009, it was reported that the British were pushing for talks between the Afghan government and the Shura. 'Major General Richard Barrons said negotiations with the senior echelons of the Afghan Taliban leadership council – the Quetta shura – were being looked at, alongside the reintegration of insurgency fighters into civilian life. In his first interview since arriving in Afghanistan to begin talks with "moderate" Taliban fighters, Barrons said British officials were backing extensive talks between Karzai's government and the Quetta shura, which is led by Omar and is responsible for directing much of the fighting against British forces in Helmand province.'

Early January 2010, some commanders from the Quetta Shura held secret exploratory talks with Kai Eide to discuss peace terms, as emerged end of that month during the International Conference on Afghanistan in London. The Shura had sought a meeting with the United Nations envoy, which took place in Dubai on January 8, 2010. This was the first such meeting between the UN and alleged senior members of the Taliban, suggesting that peace talks had revived since exploratory contacts between emissaries of the Kabul government and the Taliban in Saudi Arabia in 2009 broke down. It was not clear how significant a faction had showed up in Dubai or how serious they were. A western official confirmed that there were indications of splits in the Taliban over the prospect of a settlement. Supporters of former presidential candidate Abdullah Abdullah predicted that negotiations could fail because the Karzai government was too weak, and other critics warned that trying to buy off insurgents created a "moral hazard" of rewarding combatants who had killed Western troops and local civilians. Taliban sources denied that there had been such a meeting and dismissed them as baseless rumors.

Leaders
The Taliban's Quetta Shura is the main leadership among Afghanistan's Taliban.

According to The News International, Pakistani security officials had previously regarded Afghanistan's Taliban, the Quetta Shura, and Tehrik-i-Taliban Pakistan as three separate entities. They reported that Pakistani security officials had changed their policy in early 2010, and had decided to treat all three organizations as one organization, and to crack down on the Quetta Shura. The reported nine of its eighteen leaders were captured in late February and early March 2010.

In August 2019, some Taliban leaders, including Hafiz Ahmadullah, the brother of Taliban emir Hibatullah Akhunzada, were killed in a bomb blast at the Khair Ul Madarais mosque, which had served as the main meeting place of the Taliban, on the outskirts of Quetta.

On 29 May 2020, it was reported that Omar's son Yaqoob was now acting as leader of the Taliban after numerous Quetta Shura members where infected with COVID-19. It was previously confirmed on 7 May 2020 that Yaqoob had become head of the Taliban military commission, making him the insurgents' military chief. Among those infected in the Quetta Shura, which continued to hold in-person meetings, were Hibatullah and Sirajuddin Haqqani.

Quetta Shura members

See also
 War in Afghanistan (2001–2021)
 International Security Assistance Force
 Haqqani network
 Consultative Assembly of Saudi Arabia
 Islamic Consultative Assembly of Iran
 Consultative Assembly of Qatar

References

2002 establishments in Pakistan
Afghanistan–Pakistan relations
Counterterrorism in Pakistan
Organisations based in Quetta
Taliban
War in Afghanistan (2001–2021)
Afghanistan
Afghanistan
Legislative branch of the Government of Afghanistan
1996 establishments in Afghanistan
2021 establishments in Afghanistan